The Kuznetsov NK-12 is a Soviet turboprop engine of the 1950s, designed by the Kuznetsov design bureau.  The NK-12 drives two large four-bladed contra-rotating propellers,  diameter (NK-12MA), and  diameter (NK-12MV). It is the most powerful turboprop engine to enter service.

Design and development

The design that eventually became the NK-12 turboprop was developed after World War II by a team of Soviet scientists and deported German engineers under Ferdinand Brandner, who had worked for Junkers previously; the design bureau was headed by chief engineer Nikolai D. Kuznetsov. Thus, the NK-12 design evolved from late-war German turboprop studies. This started with the postwar development of the wartime Jumo 022 turboprop design that was designed to develop , weighing . Evolution to the TV-12  engine required extensive use of new Soviet-developed alloys and was completed in 1951.

The NK-12 is the most powerful turboprop engine to enter service, ahead of the Europrop TP400 (in 2005). The NK-12 powers the Tupolev Tu-95 bomber and its derivatives such as the Tu-142 maritime patrol aircraft and the Tupolev Tu-114 airliner (with NK-12MV), which still holds the title of the world's fastest propeller-driven aircraft despite being retired from service in 1991. It also powered the Antonov An-22 Antei (with NK-12MA), the world's largest aircraft at the time, and several types of amphibious assault craft, such as the A-90 Orlyonok "Ekranoplan".

The engine has a 14-stage axial-flow compressor, producing pressure ratios between 9:1 and 13:1 depending on altitude, with variable inlet guide vanes and blow-off valves for engine operability. The combustion system used is a cannular-type: each flame tube is centrally mounted on a downstream injector that ends in an annular secondary region. The contra-rotating propellers and compressor are driven by the five-stage axial turbine. Mass flow is 65 kg (143 lb) per second.

Variants

Data from Alexandrov

NK-12, initial development model, used on the Tupolev Tu-95 and Tupolev Tu-116
NK-12M, used on the Tupolev Tu-114
NK-12MV,  AV-60 propellers, used on the Tupolev Tu-95, Tupolev Tu-126, and Tupolev Tu-142
NK-12MA,  AV-90 propellers, used on the Antonov An-22
NK-12MK,  propellers, built with corrosion-resistant materials, used on the A-90 Orlyonok
NK-12MP, modernized version used on the Tupolev Tu-95MS and Tupolev Tu-142M
NK-12MPM Upgraded version of the NK-12MP that develops more power, produces half the vibration and is paired with the Aerosila AV-60T propeller; replaces the NK-12MP engine and AV-60K propeller on the Tupolev Tu-95MS

Applications

 A-90 Orlyonok
 Antonov An-22
 Tupolev Tu-95
 Tupolev Tu-114
 Tupolev Tu-116
 Tupolev Tu-126
 Tupolev Tu-142

Specifications (NK-12MV)

See also

References

External links

 ciad.ssau.ru - Image
 airventure.de - Image, finnish museum
 

NK-12
1950s turboprop engines